Glendola is an unincorporated community located within Wall Township in Monmouth County, New Jersey, United States. It is the location of the Glendola Reservoir. Most of the area consists of single-family residences along numerous streets throughout the settlement. The main east-west road through Glendola is Belmar Boulevard (County Route 18) while access to the nearby Route 18 freeway is provided via Brighton Avenue.

References

Wall Township, New Jersey
Unincorporated communities in Monmouth County, New Jersey
Unincorporated communities in New Jersey